William Dean is an American former Negro league catcher who played in the 1940s.

Dean played for the Philadelphia Stars in 1940. In three recorded games, he posted two hits in seven plate appearances.

References

External links
 and Seamheads

Year of birth missing
Place of birth missing
Philadelphia Stars players
Baseball catchers